Tereza Ďurdiaková (born 20 February 1991) is a Czech racewalking athlete. She qualified to represent the Czech Republic at the 2020 Summer Olympics in Tokyo 2021, competing in women's 20 kilometres walk.

References

External links
 
 

1991 births
Living people
Czech female racewalkers
Athletes (track and field) at the 2020 Summer Olympics
Olympic athletes of the Czech Republic
Sportspeople from Brno
20th-century Czech women
21st-century Czech women